Yunier Pérez Romero (born February 16, 1985 in San José de las Lajas) is a Cuban track and field athlete, who specializes in sprinting events.

He won gold medals with the Cuban relay team at the 2008 Central American and Caribbean Championships in Cali, Colombia, with an Olympic qualifying time of 3:02.10. Perez competed for the men's 4 × 400 m relay at the 2008 Summer Olympics in Beijing, along with his teammates Omar Cisneros, William Collazo, and Yunior Díaz. He ran on the starting leg of the first heat, with an individual-split time of 45.95 seconds. Perez and his national relay team, however, finished seventh in the preliminary heats, for a total time of 3:02.24, failing to advance into the final round.

Personal bests

All information taken from IAAF profile.

Achievements

References

External links

NBC 2008 Olympics profile

Living people
1985 births
Cuban male sprinters
Olympic athletes of Cuba
Athletes (track and field) at the 2008 Summer Olympics
People from San José de las Lajas
21st-century Cuban people